Whale Island is an island of the Kodiak Archipelago in the Gulf of Alaska in Kodiak Island Borough, Alaska, United States. It lies off the northern end of Kodiak Island, between it and Afognak Island to the north. It is separated from Kodiak Island by Whale Pass, and from Afognak Island by Afognak Strait. Raspberry Island lies to the west, while Spruce Island lies to the east. Whale Island has a land area of 39.235 km2 (15.149 sq mi) and is unpopulated.

References

Islands of the Kodiak Archipelago
Islands of Alaska